Luigi Spozio (17 April 1936 – 22 October 1999) was an Italian rower. He competed in the men's eight event at the 1960 Summer Olympics.

References

External links
 

1936 births
1999 deaths
Italian male rowers
Olympic rowers of Italy
Rowers at the 1960 Summer Olympics
People from Lodi, Lombardy
Sportspeople from the Province of Lodi